is a former Japanese football player.

Club career
Kuba was born in Kanagawa Prefecture on November 21, 1984. After graduating from high school, he joined Tokyo Verdy in 2003. He debuted in 2005. However he could hardly play in the match and the club was relegated to J2 League end of 2005 season. Although his opportunity to play increased in 2006, he resigned and retired end of 2006 season.

National team career
In September 2001, Kuba was selected Japan U-17 national team for 2001 U-17 World Championship. He played 2 matches.

Club statistics

References

External links

library.footballjapan.jp

1984 births
Living people
Association football people from Kanagawa Prefecture
Japanese footballers
Japan youth international footballers
J1 League players
J2 League players
Tokyo Verdy players
Association football midfielders